Desert Assault, known in Japan as , is a 1991 run and gun arcade game by Data East. In this arcade game, up to four players control four soldiers holding machine guns and other projectile weapons, while fighting their way through the terrorist arsenal to take control of the Persian War.

Reception 
In Japan, Game Machine listed Desert Assault on their June 15, 1991 issue as being the fourth most-successful table arcade unit of the month.

References

External links
Official G-Mode webpage of Desert Assault

arcade-history

1991 video games
Arcade video games
Arcade-only video games
Gulf War video games
Run and gun games
Data East video games
Multiplayer and single-player video games
Video games developed in Japan
Data East arcade games